Gurilynia is a genus of enantiornithine birds. One species is known, G. nessovi. It lived during the Maastrichtian stage of the Late Cretaceous period, between 70 and 66 mya. Gurilynia is known from fragmentary fossils found at the Gurilyn Tsav locality of the Nemegt Formation in south Gobi, Mongolia.

Description 
The fossil material includes three partial bones. The holotype is the proximal end of a right humerus, catalog number PIN 4499-12. A paratype is the distal end of a left humerus, catalog number PIN 4499-14. The last paratype is the shoulder end of a left coracoid, catalog number PIN 4499-13. All three fossils are in the collection of the Paleontological Institute of the Russian Academy of Sciences. The material is depicted in the journal with both photographs and illustrations.

Kurochkin also mentions that "The additional distal portions of the ulna, radius, and carpometacarpus from the same beds also very probably belong to the Enantiornithes." This passage may describe PIN 4499-1, which was later assigned to Teviornis. Kurochkin also adds that G. nessovi demonstrates that there were large Enantiornithids in Central Asia as well as the Americas at the end of the Cretaceous.

References

Euenantiornitheans
Fossil taxa described in 1999
Late Cretaceous birds of Asia
Nemegt fauna